Caldwell Memorial Hospital is a private, not-for-profit community hospital located in Lenoir, North Carolina, United States. Lenoir is the county seat of Caldwell County. The hospital's president and CEO is Laura J. Easton.

History
In December 1945, campaigns began to raise local money in order to receive state and federal funding to start building the hospital. Construction began in 1949 and on January 1, 1951 the hospital had its first patient. The hospital's medical staff started with 17 members.

In 2016, the hospital joined the UNC Health Care system.

Divisions
 Anderson Medical Park
 The Ambulatory Infusion Center
 Caldwell Memorial Sleep Center
 Caldwell Rehabilitation Services
 The Center for Breast Health
 Center for Diabetes Health
 Center for Wound Treatment
 Community Pharmacy
 Digestive Health Center
 The Falls Medical Park
 The Falls Pediatrics
 The Family BirthPlace
 George M. Hancock Surgery Center
 Laurel Park Women's Health
 McBurney Primary Care
 McCreary Cancer Center
 Mulberry Pediatrics
 Pain Management Center
 Mulberry Pediatrics
 The Pain Management Center
 The Quest4Life Wellness Center
 Robbins Cardiology
 Robbins Ear, Nose, Throat & Allergy
 Robbins Medical Park
 Robbins Pulmonology
 Robbins Surgical
 Southfork Medical Park
 Westpointe Medical Practice

Awards
 “Top Performer on Key Quality Measures®” Recognition from The Joint Commission
 Community Value FIVE-STAR® Hospital by Cleverley + Associates
 Second Hospital in NC to Earn Triple Gold Awards from Prevention Partners for worksite wellness: in the areas of physical activity, nutrition, and tobacco-free environments
 Silver Award from the North Carolina Department of Labor
 Caldwell County Economic Development Commission Industry of the Year for 2012

Notes

References
 U.S. News & World Report - Hospital Directory - Caldwell Memorial Hospital
 HospitalData.com - Caldwell Memorial Hospital
 Caldwell Memorial Hospital - Doctor Vista

External links
 Caldwell Memorial Hospital (Official site)

Hospital buildings completed in 1950
Hospitals in North Carolina
Buildings and structures in Caldwell County, North Carolina